Massiah v. United States, 377 U.S. 201 (1964), was a case in which the Supreme Court of the United States held that the Sixth Amendment to the United States Constitution prohibits the government from eliciting statements from the defendant about themselves after the point that the Sixth Amendment right to counsel attaches.

In Massiah, the defendant had been indicted on a federal narcotics charge. He retained a lawyer, pleaded not guilty, and was released on bail. A co-defendant, after deciding to cooperate with the government, invited Massiah to sit in his car and discuss the crime he was indicted on, during which the government listened in via a radio transmitter. During the conversation, Massiah made several incriminating statements, and those statements were introduced at trial to be used against him.

Massiah appealed his conviction, which was affirmed in part by the Court of Appeals for the Second Circuit. The Supreme Court granted certiorari and reversed, holding that the statements made by the defendant outside the presence of his attorney must be suppressed.

The Massiah rule applies to the use of testimonial evidence in criminal proceedings deliberately elicited by the police from a defendant after formal charges have been filed. The events that trigger the Sixth Amendment safeguards under Massiah are (1) the commencement of adversarial criminal proceedings and (2) deliberate elicitation of information from the defendant by governmental agents.

The Sixth Amendment guarantees a defendant a right to counsel in all criminal prosecutions. The purposes of the Sixth Amendment right to counsel are to protect a defendant's right to a fair trial and to assure that our adversarial system of justice functions properly by providing competent counsel as an advocate for the defendant in his contest against the “prosecutorial forces” of the state.

The Sixth Amendment right “attaches” once the government has committed itself to the prosecution of the case by the initiation of adversarial judicial proceedings "by way of formal charge, preliminary hearing, indictment, information or arraignment,". Determining whether a particular event or proceeding constitutes the commencement of adversarial criminal proceedings requires both an examination of the rules of criminal procedure for the jurisdiction in which the crime is charged and the Supreme Court cases dealing with the issue of when formal prosecution begins. Once adversarial criminal proceedings commence the right to counsel applies to all critical stages of the prosecution and investigation. A critical stage is "any stage of the prosecution, formal or informal, in court or out, where counsel's absence might derogate from the accused's right to a fair trial."

Government attempts to obtain incriminating statement related to the offense charged from the defendant by overt interrogation or surreptitious means is a critical stage and any information thus obtained is subject to suppression unless the government can show that an attorney was present or the defendant knowingly, voluntarily and intelligently waived his right to counsel.

Deliberate elicitation is defined as the intentional creation of circumstances by government agents that are likely to produce incriminating information from the defendant. Clearly express questioning (interrogation) would qualify but the concept also extends to surreptitious attempts to acquire information from the defendant through the use of undercover agents or paid informants.

The definition of "deliberate elicitation"  is not the same as the definition of "interrogation" under the Miranda rule established in Miranda v. Arizona. Miranda interrogation includes express questioning and any actions or statements that an officer would reasonably foresee as likely to cause an incriminating response. Massiah applies to express questioning and any attempt to deliberately and intentionally obtain incriminating information from the defendant regarding the crime charged. The difference is purposeful creation of an environment likely to produce incriminating information (Massiah) and action likely to induce an incriminating response even if that was not the officer's purpose or intent (Miranda).

The Sixth Amendment right to counsel is offense specific - the right only applies to post commencement attempts to obtain information relating to the crime charged. The right does not extend to uncharged offenses even those that are factually related to the charged crime.

As noted, information obtained in violation of the defendant's Sixth Amendment right to counsel is subject to suppression unless the government can establish that the defendant waived his right to counsel. The waiver must be knowing, intelligent and voluntary. A valid Miranda waiver operates as a waiver of Sixth Amendment right.

Massiah vs. Miranda

Massiah and the voluntariness Standard

The Massiah rule is also to be contrasted with the voluntariness standard of the Fifth and Fourteenth Amendments. The voluntariness standard applies to all police interrogations regardless of the custodial status of the suspect and regardless of whether the suspect has been formally charged. The remedy for a violation of the standard is complete suppression of the statement and any evidence derived from the statement. The statement cannot be used as either substantive evidence of guilt or to impeach the defendant's testimony. The reason for the strictness is the common law's aversion to the use of coerced confessions because of their inherent unreliability. Further the rights to be free from coerced confession cannot be waived nor is it necessary that the victim of coercive police conduct assert his right. In considering the voluntariness standard one must consider the Supreme Court's decision in Colorado v. Connelly. Although federal courts' application of the Connelly rule has been inconsistent and state courts have often failed to appreciate the consequences of the case, Connelly clearly marked a significant change in the application of the voluntariness standard. Before Connelly the test was whether the confession was voluntary considering the totality of the circumstances. "Voluntary" carried its everyday meaning - the confession had to be a product of the exercise of the defendant's free will rather than police coercion. After Connelly the totality of circumstances test is not even triggered unless the defendant can show coercive police conduct. Questions of free will and rational decision making are irrelevant to a due process claim unless police misconduct existed and a causal connection can be shown between the misconduct and the confession.

See also
 Miranda warning
 Miranda v. Arizona
 List of United States Supreme Court cases, volume 377

References

External links
 
 

1964 in United States case law

United States Supreme Court cases
United States Supreme Court cases of the Warren Court